United Nations Security Council resolution 1103, adopted unanimously on 31 March 1997, after recalling all resolutions on the conflicts in the former Yugoslavia and in particular resolutions 1035 (1995) and 1088 (1996), the Council authorised an increase in the strength of the United Nations Mission in Bosnia and Herzegovina (UNMIBH) in Bosnia and Herzegovina.

The Security Council reiterated that it was important that the Dayton Agreement was fully implemented, especially the provisions on co-operation with the International Criminal Tribunal for the former Yugoslavia. On 14 February 1997, the arbitration tribunal had ruled on the disputed Brčko District between the two states of Bosnia and Herzegovina.

The resolution then authorised an increase in the strength of UNMIBH by 186 police and 11 civilian personnel on a recommendation by the Secretary-General so that it could carry out its mandate as described in Resolution 1088 (1996). All parties were invited to implement the peace agreement and to co-operate with the United Nations International Police Task Force (UN-IPTF). It was also important that the UN-IPTF co-operated with the Stabilisation Force, particularly in Brčko.

See also
 Bosnian War
 List of United Nations Security Council Resolutions 1101 to 1200 (1997–1998)
 Yugoslav Wars

References

External links
 
Text of the Resolution at undocs.org

 1103
 1103
1997 in Yugoslavia
1997 in Bosnia and Herzegovina
 1103
March 1997 events